Reginald D. Smith (born August 21, 1970) is an American former professional basketball player who played in the NBA for the Portland Trail Blazers.

External links 

1970 births
Living people
American expatriate basketball people in Australia
American expatriate basketball people in France
American expatriate basketball people in Spain
American men's basketball players
Basketball players from San Jose, California
Centers (basketball)
Élan Béarnais players
Leland High School (San Jose, California) alumni
Liga ACB players
Newcastle Falcons (basketball) players
Portland Trail Blazers draft picks
Portland Trail Blazers players
Power forwards (basketball)
TCU Horned Frogs men's basketball players